Frank Fitzpatrick (2 March 1932 – 27 June 2003) was an Australian rules footballer who played with Geelong in the Victorian Football League (VFL).

Fitzpatrick was recruited to Geelong on the back of two strong seasons playing for Rochester in the Bendigo Football League. He won the 1956 and 1957 Michelsen Medals. While at Geelong he made nine appearances, all in the 1958 VFL season.

References

1932 births
Australian rules footballers from Victoria (Australia)
Geelong Football Club players
Rochester Football Club players
2003 deaths